The  Mampituba River is a river forming part of the boundary between Santa Catarina and Rio Grande do Sul states in southeastern Brazil.

See also
List of rivers of Santa Catarina
List of rivers of Rio Grande do Sul

References
 Map from Ministry of Transport

Rivers of Rio Grande do Sul
Rivers of Santa Catarina (state)